Bay High School or Bays High School can refer to one of the following high schools:

In Australia 
 Batemans Bay High School, Batemans Bay, New South Wales
 Byron Bay High School, Byron Bay, New South Wales
 Maroubra Bay High School, Marouba, New South Wales
 Warners Bay High School, Warners Bay, New South Wales
 Geilston Bay High School, Geilston Bay, Tasmania
 Rose Bay High School, Rose Bay, Tasmania
 Montrose Bay High School, Rosetta, Tasmania
 Trinity Bay State High School, Cairns, Queensland
 Deception Bay State High School, Deception Bay, Queensland
 Safety Bay Senior High School, Safety Bay, Western Australia

In Canada 
 Oak Bay High School, Oak Bay, British Columbia
 Glace Bay High School, Glace Bay, Nova Scotia
 Morrison Glace Bay High School, Glace Bay, Nova Scotia

In Jamaica 
 Morant Bay High School, Morant Bay, St Thomas

In Pakistan 
 Bay View High School (Karachi), Karachi

In South Africa 
 Camps Bay High School, Cape Town, Western Cape
 False Bay High School, Strand, Western Cape

In the United Kingdom 
 Herne Bay High School, Herne Bay, Kent, England
 Whitley Bay High School, Whitley Bay, North Tyneside, England

In the United States 
 Red Bay High School, Red Bay, Alabama
 Bay High School (Arkansas), Bay, Arkansas
 Granite Bay High School, Granite Bay, California
 Half Moon Bay High School, Half Moon Bay, California
 Morro Bay High School, Moro Bay, California
 Mission Bay Senior High School, San Diego, California
 Lemon Bay High School, Englewood, Florida
 East Bay High School, Gibsonton, Florida
 Palm Bay Magnet High School, Melbourne, Florida
 Tampa Bay Technical High School, Tampa, Florida
 Bay High School (Florida), Panama City, Florida
 Cypress Bay High School, Weston, Florida
 Casco Bay High School, Portland, Maine
 Dollar Bay High School, Dollar Bay, Michigan
 Anchor Bay High School, Fair Haven, Michigan
 Bay High School (Mississippi), Bay St. Louis, Mississippi
 Sheepshead Bay High School, Brooklyn, New York City, New York
 Bay Shore High School, Bay Shore, New York
 Oyster Bay High School, Oyster Bay, New York
 Hampton Bays High School, Southampton, New York
 Bay High School (Ohio), Bay Village, Ohio
 Put-in-Bay High School, Put-In-Bay, Ohio
 Carvers Bay High School, Hemingway, South Carolina
 Cane Bay High School, Summerville, South Carolina
 Bay City High School, Bay City, Texas
 Hudson's Bay High School, Vancouver, Washington
 Bay View High School, Bay View, Milwaukee, Wisconsin
 Green Bay East High School, Green Bay, Wisconsin
 Green Bay Southwest High School, Green Bay, Wisconsin
 Green Bay West High School, Green Bay, Wisconsin
 Bay Port High School, Suamico, Wisconsin
 Whitefish Bay High School, Whitefish Bay, Wisconsin
 Williams Bay High School, Williams Bay, Wisconsin

In New Zealand 
 Golden Bay High School, Golden Bay
 Green Bay High School, Green Bay